

Fonofos is an organothiophosphate insecticide primarily used on corn.  It is highly toxic and listed as an extremely hazardous substance.

Physical and chemical properties

Physical properties
At room temperature, fonofos has a clear-to-yellow color. It has a distinct Mercaptan odour. It is soluble in most common organic Solvents. 
It is available in multiple forms, including granular, microgranular,

References

Acetylcholinesterase inhibitors
Ethyl esters
Organophosphate insecticides